Whatcha See Is Whatcha Get may refer to:

 "Whatcha See Is Whatcha Get" (album), a 1971 album by The Dramatics
 "Whatcha See Is Whatcha Get" (song), the title track from the album
 Stand by Me (Whatcha See Is Whatcha Get), 1971 album by Pretty Purdie and The Playboys

See also
WYSIWYG (disambiguation)
What You See Is What You Get (disambiguation)